Anti-Terrorist Squad may refer to:
 Anti-Terrorism Squad (India), Indian ATS
 Special Tactics Group (formerly Anti-Terrorist Squad) of the New Zealand Police